Kalthof Church was a Protestant church in the Kalthof quarter of eastern Königsberg, Germany.

Berthold Kleist, the last owner of the estate Kalthof, donated land in 1899 and 70,000 marks in 1901 for the building of a new church. Construction of the Neo-Gothic church occurred from 1905 to 1907 and included tiles from Kadinen. The church was formally named the Kaiser-Friedrich-Gedächtniskirche (Emperor Frederick Memorial Church) after Frederick III, German Emperor, upon the request of Kleist. It became a separate parish from Altrossgarten Church in 1924. Damaged during the Battle of Königsberg, the church's ruins were demolished by the Soviet Union in the 1980s.

References

1905 establishments in Germany
1945 disestablishments in Germany
20th-century Lutheran churches in Germany
Buildings and structures demolished in the 1980s
Buildings and structures in Germany destroyed during World War II
Destroyed churches in Germany
Former churches in Königsberg
Gothic Revival church buildings in Germany
Lutheran churches in Königsberg
Churches completed in 1905
Christian organizations established in 1905
Frederick III, German Emperor